{{Taxobox
| image = Tomarus gibbosus.jpg
| image_caption = not Tomarus gibbosus…This is Orizabus or Aphonus
| regnum = Animalia
| phylum = Arthropoda
| classis = Insecta
| ordo = Coleoptera
| subordo = Polyphaga
| superfamilia = Scarabaeoidea
| familia = Scarabaeidae
| subfamilia = Dynastinae
| genus = Tomarus|genus_authority = Erichson, 1847
|subdivision_ranks = Species
|subdivision = 37, see text
|synonyms = Ligyrus}}Tomarus is a genus of scarab beetles in the subfamily Dynastinae, the rhinoceros beetles. They are native to the Americas, where they are distributed from the central United States to Argentina, and a few species occur in the Caribbean.

The adult beetles are nocturnal and attracted to lights; the larvae generally remain in the soil, often feeding on plant roots.

In order to identify species, the parameres of the male must be pulled out of the abdomen and examined. This process should be done carefully, because the parameres are quite fragile, "almost parchment-like".

Species
These 37 species belong to the genus Tomarus:Ratcliffe, B. C. (2003). The dynastine scarab beetles of Costa Rica and Panama (Coleoptera: Scarabaeidae: Dynastinae). Bulletin of the University of Nebraska State Museum 16, 1-506.

 Tomarus adoceteus Ratcliffe & Cave, 2010 c g
 Tomarus bidentulus (Fairmaire, 1892) c
 Tomarus bituberculatus (Palisot De Beauvois, 1805) c g
 Tomarus burmeisteri (Steinheil, 1872) c g
 Tomarus cicatricosus (Prell, 1937) c g
 Tomarus colombianus Lopez-Garcia & Gasca-Alvarez, 2014 g
 Tomarus columbianus López-García & Gasca-Álvarez, 2014 c g
 Tomarus compositus (Wickham, 1911) c g
 Tomarus cuniculus (Fabricius, 1801) i c g b
 Tomarus discrepans Escalona & Joly, 2006 c g
 Tomarus ebenus (Degeer, 1774) c g
 Tomarus effetus (Wickham, 1914) c g
 Tomarus formosianus Grouvelle, 1913 g
 Tomarus fossor (Latreille, 1833) c g
 Tomarus gibbosus gibbosus (De Geer, 1774) i c g b (carrot beetle)
 Tomarus gibbosus obsoletus (DeGeer, 1774) g
 Tomarus gibbosus (LeConte, 1856) g
 Tomarus gyas Erichson, 1848 c g
 Tomarus laevicollis (Bates, 1888) i c g
 Tomarus maimon Erichson, 1847 c g
 Tomarus maternus (Prell, 1937) c g
 Tomarus nasutus (Burmeister, 1847) i c g
 Tomarus neglectus (LeConte, 1847) i c g b
 Tomarus peruvianus (Endrödi, 1970) c
 Tomarus pullus (Prell, 1937) c g
 Tomarus pumilus (Prell, 1937) c g
 Tomarus relictus (Say, 1825) i c g b
 Tomarus roigjunenti Neita & Ratcliffe, 2017 c g
 Tomarus rosettae (Endrödi, 1968) c g
 Tomarus rostratus Dupuis, 2014 c g
 Tomarus rubripes (Boheman, 1858) c g
 Tomarus sallaei (Bates, 1888) i c g b
 Tomarus selanderi (Cartwright, 1959) i c g
 Tomarus similis (Endrödi, 1968) c g
 Tomarus spinipenis Neita & Ratcliffe, 2017 c g
 Tomarus subtropicus (Blatchley, 1922) i c g b (sugarcane grub)

 Tomarus villosus'' (Burmeister, 1847) c g

Data sources: i = ITIS, c = Catalogue of Life, g = GBIF, b = Bugguide.net

References

Dynastinae
Beetles of South America